Nik Nanos (born in 1964 as Nikita James Nanos) is a Canadian public opinion pollster, entrepreneur, public speaker, author, and expert in political, business and social trends.

Early life and education 
The son of Greek immigrants, he grew up in Trenton Ontario, Canada attending Dufferin Public School and Prince Charles Public School with one year at Trenton High School. With the sudden death of his father, he moved to Oshawa Ontario and attended O’Neill Collegiate and Vocational Institute where he was the Poet Laureate in his final year of high school. He attended Queen's University in Kingston Ontario.

He founded SES Canada Research Inc., the precursor of Nanos Research, as an undergraduate student at Queen’s University. While at Queen’s he was President of the Queen’s Debating Union and represented Queen’s in Canada, the United States, and at the National and World Debating Championships for extemporaneous parliamentary debating.

Nik Nanos has undergraduate degrees in history and political studies and a Master of Business Administration from Queen's University in Canada. His training includes PhD level studies at the University of Nottingham School of Politics and International Relations in the United Kingdom. Between 2008 and 2021 he was a Research Associate Professor at the State University of New York at Buffalo specializing in US-Canada relations. Nik Nanos is currently a Global Fellow at the Woodrow Wilson International Center for Scholars in Washington DC doing research on populism and energy politics, and a Senior Fellow at the University of Ottawa’s Collaboratory on Energy Research and Policy. Nik has also been elected a Fellow of the Canadian Research and Insights Council (FCRIC), the highest professional designation in the marketing research industry in Canada, and holds a Certified Management Consulting (CMC) designation.

Career
Nik Nanos is Chairman of the Nanos Research Group of Companies and is business partners with his brother John Nanos who is also a graduate of Queen’s University.

At the beginning of his career the firm conducted a controversial riding survey that predicted Peter Milliken (later to become the Speaker of the House of Commons of Canada), a relatively unknown Liberal federal candidate in the riding of Kingston and the Islands, would defeat senior Progressive Conservative Cabinet Minister Flora Macdonald in the 1988 Canadian Federal Election. He also pioneered publicly released nightly election tracking in 2004 with the Cable Public Affairs Channel and has conducted nightly tracking in every federal election in Canada since that time. In the 2006 election his results were within one tenth of one percent for all the major parties – a first in Canadian polling history.

The Nanos Research Group of Companies includes Nanos-dimap Analytika, an analytics and targeting research practice, which is a joint venture with dimap, a research organization in Germany. Nik also leads the team behind the Nanos Bloomberg Canadian Confidence Index which monitors consumer confidence in the Canadian economy and whose data is streamed to Bloomberg News terminals every week.

His analysis and insight has appeared in the Economist Magazine, the Wall Street Journal, Bloomberg, Reuters, The Guardian, the BBC and all of Canada’s major media outlets. He is the pollster of record for The Globe and Mail, Canada’s National Newspaper and CTV News, Canada’s largest private broadcaster. He is a regular contributor to the Globe and Mail with his monthly column Data Dive, and has a weekly segment on CTV News Channel – Nanos on the Numbers which profiles the latest political social and business trends.

Nik founded Nanos while an undergraduate student at Queen’s University. Since that time he has built a reputation for polling reliability and insight. He conducted all the research for Staples Business Depot in Canada as it expanded from 19 to 225 stores. He is a regular expert for BellMedia on telecommunications regulatory issues before the Canada Radio-television and Telecommunications Commission and has conducted numerous due diligence research projects for KPMG’s Mergers and Acquisition practice. Nik has also been an expert for reputation and trademark litigations for clients such as Staples, Adidas, PepsiCo, Heineken, Bodum and IMAX.

Nik Nanos has been named one of the Top 100 most influential people in government and politics in Canada in 2021 by The Hill Times and is a regular public speaker at conferences.

His research focuses on the application of supervised and unsupervised machine learning algorithms and the integration of large scale behavioral and sentiment datasets.

He is the author of The Age of Voter Rage, published by Eyewear Publishing Limited in the United Kingdom. The book explores populist politics and how small swings in voter sentiment and computational propaganda influence democratic outcomes in the United States, Canada, the UK and France. Nanos was also a contributing writer for the book Tactical Reading: A Snappy Guide to the Snap Election 2017, which explores the landscape in the 2017 UK General Election.

Service and Philanthropy
Nanos was the 2006-2007 National President of the Marketing Research and Intelligence Association (MRIA), which governs and accredits over 260 research organizations and over 1,700 research professionals.

During his tenure as National President, he presided over the launch of the Charter of Respondent Rights, the renewal of the marketing research industry’s professional designation and a review of the standards regulating market and public opinion research in Canada.

He served as the Chair of the Board of Governors of Carleton University between 2018 and 2020 and presided over the installation of the Chancellor Yaprak Baltacıoğlu, C.M. and the President Benoit-Antoine Bacon. Carleton University has 26,000 students and a budget of over $450M CDN.

Nanos also serves as one of 18 Honorary Captains in the Royal Canadian Navy. HCaptain (Navy) Nanos serves with other distinguished Canadians such as Jim Balsillie, the co-founder of Blackberry and the Honorable Noel Kinsella, former Speaker of the Senate of Canada. The Honorary Captains act as ambassadors for the Royal Canadian Navy to the Canadian people as a whole.

With an interest advancing and supporting journalism, Nanos led the creation and championed the G. Stuart Adam Award in Journalism, which gives outstanding Master of Journalism students at Carleton the means to go out into the field, across Canada or abroad, to produce their capstone Master’s Research Project. Nanos also established the Commander of the Royal Canadian Navy Scholarship. Awarded annually by the Dean of Graduate and Postdoctoral Affairs, on the recommendation of the Director of the Norman Paterson School of International Affairs (NPSIA) to an outstanding graduate student enrolled in NPSIA and specializing in Security and Defense Studies, with a focus on the Royal Canadian Navy and/or the Canadian Armed Forces Endowed in 2018. He also created the Indigenous Enriched Support Program School Mentorship Fund at Carleton University. Carleton's Indigenous Enriched Support Program (IESP) supports the educational aspirations and success of Indigenous youth. Through its school mentoring program, it offers an opportunity for Carleton students to work as peer mentors with Indigenous elementary and high school students in the Ottawa area, through involvement in the classroom, lunchtime or after-school programs and/or cultural clubs. By matching Carleton Indigenous students with Indigenous youth, the program strengthens educational opportunities for Indigenous youth across critical development periods. He is a regular supporter through research of the Canadian Journalists for Free Expression, which works to defend and protect the right to free expression in Canada and around the world. Nik is a past Chair of the Government of Ontario’s Constable Joe Macdonald Public Safety Officers Survivors’ Scholarship Fund, which assists the families of police and public safety officers killed in the line of duty with the costs of post-secondary education.

Nik has served as the 69th President of the Rideau Club of Canada. The founding President of the Club was Canada’s first Prime Minister, Sir John A. Macdonald. Other presidents of the Club have included Prime Ministers Robert Borden and Lester B. Pearson.

In 2022, Nik was elected as the Chair of the Board of the Canadian Research and Insights Council (CRIC) which is the governing body for standards with the research industry in Canada. He is a founding member of the council and served as the Vice Chair and the Standards Chair for CRIC.

Nik currently serves on the Board of The Hellenic Initiative Canada, a registered charity which funds programs in Greece that secure food for children and provide access to healthcare for all. 

He is a member of the Canadian Order of AHEPA which was founded in the United States in 1922 to fight for civil rights and against discrimination, bigotry and hatred. AHEPA is the largest and oldest grassroots association of citizens of Greek heritage and Philhellenes with more than 400 chapters across Canada, United States and Europe.

References

External links
Nanos Research 
Personal blog 
SES Research

Canadian public relations people
Living people
1964 births
Pollsters